The Sultan Ibrahim Stadium is a football stadium in Iskandar Puteri, Johor, Malaysia. It is named in honor of the state's current ruler, Sultan Ibrahim ibni Almarhum Sultan Iskandar.

As the new home of Johor Darul Ta'zim of the Malaysia Super League since 2020, the stadium replaced Larkin Stadium which has housed the current team and all previous Johor football teams since 1964. The total cost of the construction was estimated at MYR200 million. The stadium has a capacity for 40,000 spectators and opened on 22 February 2020.

Design 
Inspired by the banana-leaf, the final concept and design was unveiled by Tunku Ismail in a ceremony held in Iskandar Puteri, Johor. The stadium spans at 140,000 square meters with a total built area of 70,000 square meters and can accommodate up to 40,000 people. Red, blue and white LEDs (colours of the Johor flag) are installed outside the stadium for night time illumination. The stadium also includes the club's headquarters, training centre and a megastore.

An integral wind tunnel testing for the stadium's design was conducted by Guangdong Provincial Academy of Building Research Group, a subsidiary of Guangdong Construction Engineering Group Co Ltd.

Construction 
With the cost of the construction of a new stadium estimated at MYR200 million, the Sultan of Johor granted the funds needed for the construction.

Country Garden Pacificview Sdn Bhd has been given the responsibility to build the stadium.

In January 2017, the club announced that the construction has been delayed by few months and to be completed between July and year end of 2018 following adjustments made by Tunku Ismail on the stadium's location, technical and design changes.

References 

Johor Darul Ta'zim F.C.
2020 establishments in Malaysia
Sports venues completed in 2020
Football venues in Malaysia
Sports venues in Johor
Buildings and structures in Iskandar Puteri